A referendum on the Maastricht Treaty was held in Denmark on 2 June 1992. It was rejected by 50.7% of voters with a turnout of 83.1%. The rejection was a blow to the process of European integration, although the process continued. The result of the referendum, along with the "" in the French Maastricht referendum signaled the end of the "permissive consensus" on European integration which had existed in most of continental Europe until then. This was expressed by Pascal Lamy, chef de cabinet for Jacques Delors, the president of the European Commission, who remarked that, "Europe was built in a Saint-Simonian [i.e., technocratic] way from the beginning, this was Monnet's approach: The people weren't ready to agree to integration, so you had to get on without telling them too much about what was happening. Now Saint-Simonianism is finished. It can’t work when you have to face democratic opinion." From this point forward issues relating to European integration were subject to much greater scrutiny across much of Europe, and overt euroscepticism gained prominence. Only France, Denmark and Ireland held referendums on Maastricht ratification.

As the Maastricht Treaty could only come into effect if all members of the European Union ratified it, the Edinburgh Agreement, negotiated in the months following the referendum, provided Denmark with four exceptions which eventually led to Denmark ratifying the Maastricht Treaty in a 1993 referendum.

Results

By county

Opt-outs
The opt-outs are outlined in the Edinburgh Agreement and concern the EMU (as above), the Common Security and Defence Policy (CSDP), Justice and Home Affairs (JHA) and the citizenship of the European Union. With these opt-outs the Danish people accepted the treaty in a second referendum held in 1993.

The EMU opt-out meant Denmark was not obliged to participate in the third phase of the European Exchange Rate Mechanism, i.e. to replace the Danish krone with the euro. The abolition of the euro opt-out was put to a referendum in 2000 and was rejected. The CSDP opt-out originally meant Denmark would not be obliged to join the Western European Union (which originally handled the defence tasks of the EU). Now it means that Denmark does not participate in the European Union's foreign policy where defence is concerned. Hence it does not take part in decisions, does not act in that area and does not contribute troops to missions conducted under the auspices of the European Union. The JHA opt-out exempts Denmark from certain areas of home affairs. Significant parts of these areas were transferred from the third European Union pillar to the first under the Amsterdam Treaty; Denmark's opt-outs from these areas were kept valid through additional protocols. Acts made under those powers are not binding on Denmark except for those relating to Schengen, which are instead conducted on an intergovernmental basis with Denmark. The citizenship opt-out stated that European citizenship did not replace national citizenship; this opt-out was rendered meaningless when the Amsterdam Treaty adopted the same wording for all members. Under the Treaty of Lisbon, Denmark can change its opt-out from a complete opt-out to the case-by-case opt-in version that applies to Ireland whenever they wish.

Aftermath
The June Movement, a Danish eurosceptic party and political organization was founded immediately after the referendum, and takes its name from the event.

References

History of the European Union
Referendums in Denmark
Denmark
1992 in Denmark
1992 in international relations
1992 in the European Economic Community
Denmark and the European Union
Referendums related to the European Union
June 1992 events in Europe
Treaty on European Union